Boris Georgiyevich Dobronravov (16 April 1896, Moscow, Imperial Russia, – 27 October 1949, Moscow, USSR) was a Russian and Soviet actor, associated with the Moscow Art Theatre.

The People's Artist of the USSR (1937), and a recipient of numerous high-profile state awards, including the Order of Lenin (1938) and the Order of the Red Banner of Labour (1837), he is best remembered for his parts in An Ardent Heart and The Storm by Alexander Ostrovsky (Narkis, Tikhon respectively), The Days of the Turbins (Mikhail Bulgakov, Myshlayevsky), Dead Souls (Nikolai Gogol, Nozdryov), The Cherry Orchard (Anton Chekhov, Lopakhin).

"Totally open and delivering instantly profound effect on stage, he was one of the very few, of whom it could be said that their performances were paid by their very heart's own blood," according to the theatre historian Inna Solovyova. Dobronravov, who always said his idea of a perfect death was the death on stage, died of heart failure after the curtain fell at the end of the second act of Tsar Fyodor Ioannovich, his 166th performance of the leading role, on the day of MAT's 51st anniversary. He is interred in Novodevichye Cemetery in Moscow. In 1920–1949 he was cast in 11 Soviet films, including Aerograd (1935) and The Virgin Land (1939).

The People's Artist of the USSR Elizaveta Alexeyeva (1901–1972), the MAT actress Maria Yulievna Dobronravova (1900–1964) and the Meritorious Artist of the RSFSR Elena Dobronravova (1932–1999), were his sister, wife and daughter, respectively.

References 

1896 births
1949 deaths
Russian male stage actors
Soviet male film actors
Moscow Art Theatre
Male actors from Moscow
Burials at Novodevichy Cemetery